Chol ( ḥōl), in most passages of the Hebrew Bible, is a word for sand.

The Leningrad Codex reads:

In the Greek Septuagint (circa 200 BCE), the translators used the Ancient Greek expression στέλεχος φοίνικος (stélechos phoínikos, "stem/trunk of a palm tree") when they reached the Hebrew chol in Job 29. Similarly, the Latin Vulgate (circa 400 CE), uses palma (Latin for "palm tree").

A number of English translations use the term "phoenix" in this verse, while the King James Version and the German language Luther Bible use "Sand".

In the New Revised Standard Version this reads:

Modern scholars have differed in their understanding of Job 29:18. Roelof Van den Broek (1971) believed that "sand" was the most appropriate interpretation in this verse, following the usage in other verses. On his interpretation, "multiply my days like the sand" would be a metaphor for a long life. On the other hand, Mitchell Dahood (1974) argued in favor of the interpretation "phoenix" on the basis of parallels between Job and Ugaritic texts.

The understanding of chol as a phoenix-like bird has resulted in an amount of discourse on the topic.

Notes

References

 
 Slifkin, Natan (2007). Sacred Monsters: Mysterious and Mythical Creatures of Scripture, Talmud and Midrash. Zoo Torah. 
Lecocq, Françoise (2014).  Y a-t-il un phénix dans la Bible ? À propos de Job 29:18, de Tertullien, De resurrectione carnis 13, et d’Ambroise, De excessu fratris 2, 59, Kentron 30, 2014, pp. 55–81 (https://journals.openedition.org/kentron/463).
Van den Broek, Roelof (1971). The Myth of the Phoenix: According to Classical and Early Christian Traditions … Door Roelof Van Den Broek. Translated from the Dutch by I. Seeger Brill Archive. pp. 58–60.

Animals in the Bible
Book of Job
Christian legendary creatures
Christian terminology
Greek legendary creatures
Jewish folklore
Jewish legendary creatures
Phoenix birds
Hebrew words and phrases in the Hebrew Bible